KFBN "Heaven 88.7" is a Christian radio station located in Fargo, North Dakota. The station is owned by Master's Baptist College, a ministry of Fargo Baptist Church. The station is also heard on a translator on 102.3 FM in Kulm.

KFBN is a non-profit radio station, receiving most of its donations and contributions from its listeners and Fargo Baptist Church. Most of the programming on Heaven 88.7 is made up of Bible teaching programs, and traditional worship music.

Translators
In addition to the main station, KFBN is relayed by an additional translator to widen its broadcast area.

External links
Heaven 88.7

FBN
Radio stations established in 1950
1950 establishments in North Dakota